The Nemetati were an ancient Celtic tribe of Gallaecia, living in the north of modern Portugal between the Cávado and Ave Rivers, in the province of Minho, north of the Douro.They lived near the valley of the Ave River and may have some link with inscriptions to the war god Cosus Nemedecus. The Citânia de Sanfins (in Paços de Ferreira) could be their main hill fort. Their ethnic name comes from the Celtic nemeton (Νεμετατῶν, Ptol. 2,6,40. Celtic, to nemeto- ato-), a place belonging to the sacred site/grove (to nemeto-), or more likely, place belonging to Nemetos.

Notes

See also
Castro culture
Pre-Roman peoples of the Iberian Peninsula
Nemetes

References
Coutinhas, José Manuel (2006), Aproximação à identidade etno-cultural dos Callaici Bracari, Porto.
Queiroga, Francisco (1992), War and Castros, Oxford.
Silva, Armando Coelho Ferreira da (1986), A Cultura Castreja, Porto.

External links
Detailed map of the Pre-Roman Peoples of Iberia (around 200 BC)

Tribes of Gallaecia
Ancient peoples of Portugal